"Hold You" is a song by Swedish duo Hanna Ferm and Liamoo. The song was performed for the first time in Melodifestivalen 2019, where it made it to the final. This is Liamoo's second entry in Melodifestivalen, after his 2018 entry "Last Breath".

Charts

Weekly charts

Year-end charts

References

2019 singles
2019 songs
English-language Swedish songs
Melodifestivalen songs of 2019
Songs written by Jimmy Jansson
Songs written by Anton Hård af Segerstad